Ben Galea (born 16 August 1978) is an Australian former professional rugby league footballer. A City New South Wales representative forward, he previously played in Australasia's National Rugby League for the Balmain Tigers and the Wests Tigers (with whom he won the 2005 NRL Premiership) and also for English club the Hull Kingston Rovers and Hull F.C. of Super League.

Background
Galea was born in Parramatta, New South Wales, and is of Maltese descent. While attending Marayong John Paul II, he played for the Australian Schoolboys team in 1996.

Playing career
After struggling to make an impact in the lower grades at the Parramatta Eels, Galea signed with the newly merged Wests Tigers.

National Rugby League
In 2000 Galea in made a handful of NRL appearances for the Tigers from the bench. In 2001, Galea became a regular member of the Tigers' team. He represented City and was named the club's player of the year. After missing the first 2 games of the season, he played in every other game.

In 2003, Galea played 14 games before his season ended when he needed a shoulder reconstruction.

Galea played at second-row forward in the 2005 NRL grand final victory over the North Queensland Cowboys.  In the moments after the grand final victory, Galea was interviewed by Channel 9 sideline commentator Matthew Johns and was asked how it felt to be a premiership winner.  Galea replied, "This is unbelievable, fucking all the boys have stuck together all year, we won the comp, we’re number one, fucking ..."  In the following days, the Wests Tigers club issued an apology for the inappropriate language used by some of their players.

As NRL Premiers, Wests travelled to England to play against Super League champions Bradford Bulls in the 2006 World Club Challenge. Galea played at lock forward in the Tigers' 30–10 loss.

When Galea moved from the Wests Tigers at the end of the 2007 NRL season, he was the joint venture's second most capped player with 150 games, and second highest try scorer, with 32 tries. In 2017, Galea was made a Wests Tiger Life Member.

Super League
From 2008 to 2012 Galea played in the Super League for Hull Kingston Rovers. On 13 September 2012, Galea confirmed that he had reversed his decision to retire in order to sign a one-year deal for former West Tigers assistant Peter Gentle at Hull FC.

Highlights
Junior Club: Penrith and Blacktown Workers
First Grade Debut: 1999 - Round 14, Balmain v Western Suburbs Magpies at Campbelltown Stadium, 6 June
Premierships: Member of Wests Tigers 2005 Premiership team

Referee
As of the 2014 NRL season, Galea works regularly as a video referee in the Australian competition.

References

External links
Hull KR profile
Ben Galea Official Player Profile
Ben Galea at Superleague.co.uk

1978 births
Living people
Australian people of Maltese descent
Australian expatriate sportspeople in England
Balmain Tigers players
Blacktown Workers players
Hull F.C. players
Hull Kingston Rovers players
New South Wales City Origin rugby league team players
Rugby league locks
Rugby league players from Parramatta
Rugby league second-rows
Wests Tigers players